Kessleria alternans is a moth of the  family Yponomeutidae. It is found in France, Switzerland and Italy. It has also been recorded from the Caucasus.

The length of the forewings is 8-9.2 mm for males and 6.7-8.1 mm for females. The forewings are grey. The hindwings are light grey. Adults have been recorded from mid to the end of July.

The larvae feed on Saxifraga oppositifolia and Saxifraga paniculata. They create a spinning from which feeding takes place. The larvae have a brownish green body and light brown head.

References

Moths described in 1871
Yponomeutidae
Moths of Europe